The 2015–16 Serie D was the sixty-eighth edition of the top level Italian non-professional football championship. It represents the fourth tier in the Italian football league system.

The phoenix club of Parma Calcio was added to this league.

Promotions
The nine division winners are automatically promoted to Lega Pro.

Playoffs
Teams, placed between second and fifth in each division, enter a playoff tournament after the regular season along with the Coppa Italia Serie D winner, runners-up and best semi-finalist. The tournament provides a priority list for entry into the next year Lega Pro in the case any of the professional teams fail to meet the minimum criteria to participate.

Scudetto Serie D
The nine division winners enter a tournament which determines the overall Serie D champions and the winner is awarded the Scudetto Serie D.

Standings

Girone A

Teams 
Teams from Piedmont, Liguria and Lombardy

League table

Girone B

Teams 
Teams from Lombardy & Veneto

League table

Girone C

Teams 
Teams from Friuli-Venezia Giulia, Trentino-Alto Adige/Südtirol & Veneto

League table

Girone D

Teams 
Teams from Emilia-Romagna, Tuscany, Veneto & San Marino

League table

Girone E

Teams 
Teams from Tuscany, Umbria & Lazio

League table

Girone F

Teams 
Teams from Abruzzo, Lazio, Marche & Molise

League table

Girone G

Teams 
Teams from Lazio & Sardinia

League table

Girone H

Teams 
Teams from Apulia, Basilicata, Campania and Lazio.

League table

Girone I

Teams 
Teams from Calabria, Campania and Sicily.

League table

Scudetto Dilettanti

First round
division winners placed into 3 groups of 3
group winners and best second-placed team qualify for semi-finals
rank in Discipline Cup and head-to-head will break a tie or ties in points for the top position in a group
Listed in order in Discipline Cup: Sporting Bellinzago, Viterbese Castrense, Sambenedettese, Parma, Piacenza, Virtus Francavilla, Venezia, Siracusa, Gubbio.

Group 1

Group 2

Group 3

Semi-finals
On neutral ground.

Final
On neutral ground.

Scudetto winners: Viterbese Castrense

Promotion play-off

Rules

 The two rounds were one-legged matches played in the home field of the best-placed team.
 The games ending in ties were extended to extra time. The higher classified team was declared the winner if the game was still tied after extra time. Penalty kicks were not taken.
 Round one matched 2nd & 5th-placed teams and 3rd & 4th-placed teams within each division.
 The two winners from each division played each other in the second round.

Repechages 
 The tournament results provide a list, starting with the winner, by which vacancies could be filled in Serie C.
 If the winner is not admitted to this league it gets €30,000, while the replacement (the finalist) instead gets €15,000.

First round
matches for divisions G, H played on 22 May 2016; all others played on 15 May 2016
Single-legged matches played at best-placed club's home field: the 2nd-placed team plays the 5th-placed team at home, the 3rd-placed team plays the 4th placed team at home 
Games ending in a tie are extended to extra time; if still tied, the higher-classified team wins

Second round
matches for divisions G, H played on 29 May 2016; all others played on 22 May 2016
Single-legged matches played at best-placed club's home field
Games ending in a tie are extended to extra time; if still tied, the higher-classified team wins

Relegation play-off
Match between Lanusei and Castiadas played on 21 May 2016; match between Leonfortese and Gelbison Cilento played on 29 May 2016; all others played on 22 May 2016
Single-legged matches played on best-placed club's home ground
In case of tied score, extra time is played; if score is still level, best-placed team wins
Team highlighted in green is saved, other is relegated to Eccellenza

References

Serie D seasons
4
Italy